Féerie is the resident stage show at the Moulin Rouge, a famous cabaret venue in Paris, France.  The show premiered on 23 December 1999. It replaced the Moulin Rouge's centenary show Formidable, which ran from 20 February 1988, to 14 November 1999.  After the success of the revue Frou-Frou (1963–1965), a superstition emerged, and every show at the Moulin Rouge has since been titled with a name beginning with the letter F.  Féerie continues this tradition.

Cabarets in Paris
Theatre in Paris
Moulin Rouge